Lusia Strus (born December 13, 1969) is an American writer and stage and film actress with Neo-Futurists.

Childhood and work as a theater actress

Strus was born in Chicago, Illinois, to a Ukrainian  family. She spoke Ukrainian as her first language and attended Ukrainian school, at weekends, regularly. She had first decisive successes at performing arts, while a high school student, and attended Illinois State University. As a theater major, she joined Greg Allen's Neo-Futurist ensemble, in 1993, which she wrote solo and ensemble performances for. She has played for the Chicago Steppenwolf, Goodman, and Victory Gardens theaters as well as for the Curious Theatre Company, the Northlight Repertory, and others, and has also worked for Yoplait, WBEZ, and the Chicago Jazz Festival.

Film and TV actress

Strus is noted for her role as Adam Sandler's assistant (Alexa) in 50 First Dates, as well as for playing eclectic characters and sometimes incorporating unusual accents in her roles. Her career has spanned theatre and stage for nearly two decades. She had a recurring role on Nickelodeon's Ned's Declassified School Survival Guide as Dr. Xavier. Strus played Janine in Miss Congeniality 2: Armed and Fabulous, and plays Rachel in Jason Lew's and Gus Van Sant's Restless. She had a recurring role in Wayward Pines (2015), and played Letty's mother Estelle on Good Behavior from 2016 to 2018.

Filmography

Film

Television

References

External links

Actresses from Chicago
American film actresses
American women writers
American stage actresses
Living people
American people of Italian descent
American people of Ukrainian descent
1969 births
21st-century American women